Arm na Poblachta (meaning in English "army of the republic") is the name of a small dissident Irish republican paramilitary group believed to have been founded in 2017.

The group emerged when they claimed responsibility for planting an improvised explosive device on Pantridge road in Belfast.

It is also believed that that Arm na Poblachta were responsible for the shooting death of Antrim man Raymond Johnston in 2018.

In March 2023 the group issued , having recently left explosive devices.

Reference

2017 establishments in Ireland
Irish republican militant groups
Organizations established in 2017
Paramilitary organisations based in Northern Ireland